Emma K. Willits (20 September 1869 – 9 April 1965) was a pioneering woman physician and surgeon who played an important role in the development of Children's Hospital in San Francisco (now the California campus [Women and Children's Center] of the California Pacific Medical Center), serving as the head of the Department of General Surgery from 1921 to 1934.

She is believed to be the third woman to specialize in surgery in the United States.

Biography
Willits was born in Macedon, New York.  She was educated at Quaker schools.  In 1892 she moved to Chicago to enroll in the Women's Medical College of Chicago, then affiliated with (and later absorbed by) Northwestern University.  After receiving her medical degree in 1896, Willits served her internship at the Women's Hospital of Chicago.

In 1897, Willits moved to San Francisco as a resident at the Children's Hospital (for Women and Children).  When she completed her residency in 1900, she opened her own private practice but maintained her affiliation with Children's.  She was initially a member of the surgical staff of the Department of Pediatrics, and later became chief of the Department of Surgical Diseases of Children.  In 1921 she became the chair of the Department of General Surgery, a position she held until 1934.  She is believed to be the first woman in the United States to head a surgery department.  To add to her knowledge, she visited the Mayo Clinic several times over the course of her career;  in 1923 she spent several months studying in Vienna.  After stepping down from the chair position in 1934, she served as a consulting physician and surgeon.

During and after the time she held these hospital positions, Willits also maintained her private practice as a family doctor, retiring in 1941.

Willits' house in Palo Alto, constructed in 1926-27, was designed by architect Lionel H. Pries.

Willits was lesbian and throughout her adult life lived with her partner, Elizabeth Ristine.

Willits lived quietly in San Francisco until her death at age 95.

References

Further reading
 Edwards, Muriel, M.D., "Emma K. Willits," Journal of the American Medical Women's Association, 5/1 (January 1950):  42-43.
 "Children's Hospital will Honor Dr. Emma Willits," San Francisco Chronicle, 13 January 1941, page 7.
 "Dr. Emma Willits Dies at 95," San Francisco Chronicle, 11 April 1965, page 22 (obituary)
 "Dr. Willit [sic] Woman Surgeon," San Francisco Examiner, 10 April 1965, page 50 (obituary)

1869 births
1965 deaths
American women physicians
American surgeons
Physicians from New York (state)
LGBT people from New York (state)
Healthcare in the San Francisco Bay Area
People from Macedon, New York
LGBT physicians